Marino Venturini (23 March 1944 – 5 June 2019) was a Sammarinese politician who served as captain regent on four occasions. He was a member of the Sammarinese Socialist Party.

Biography 
His first term was with Clelio Galassi (April 1976-October 1976). His second term was with Giuseppe Maiani from (April 1982-October 1982). His third term was with Ariosto Maiani from April 1986 to October 1986. His fourth term was with Piere Natalino Mularoni (October 1995-April 1996).

In 1982 he, alongside Giuseppe Maiani, welcomed Pope John Paul II when the head of the Catholic Church arrived for a historic visit in San Marino.

Marino Venturini died on 5 June 2019 in the state hospital of San Marino.

References

1944 births
2019 deaths
People from the City of San Marino
Captains Regent of San Marino
Members of the Grand and General Council
Sammarinese Socialist Party politicians